Ablabesmyia philosphagnos is a species of fly described by Günther Beck von Mannagetta und Lerchenau in 1966.  No sub-species specified in Catalogue of Life.

References

Tanypodinae
Insects described in 1966